James Buchanan Duke House, also known as Lynnwood and White Oaks, is a historic home located in Charlotte, Mecklenburg County, North Carolina. It was designed by architect Charles Christian Hook, with the original section built in 1914 and substantially enlarged in 1919. It is an "H"-shaped Colonial Revival style dwelling consisting of large -story blocks connected by a hyphen of the same height. It features two-story tetrastyle porticos on both the south and north gable ends. It was the home of James Buchanan Duke (1856–1925) during the last five years of his life.

It was listed on the National Register of Historic Places in 1978.

References

External links

Duke family residences
American Tobacco Company
Houses on the National Register of Historic Places in North Carolina
Colonial Revival architecture in North Carolina
Houses completed in 1919
Houses in Charlotte, North Carolina
National Register of Historic Places in Mecklenburg County, North Carolina